Thomas Bromhead is an Australian actor, comedian and musician. He is best known for playing the part of Rocket in the Emmy award-winning series I Got a Rocket.

Bromhead's natural dialects are English US, British and Australian.

He is also known for being an impressionist.

Career
Bromhead grew up in England and Australia. He resides in the U.S.  He has performed in over 1000 commercial, promotional and game voiceovers, including the Australian promo voice for KidsCo.

Bromhead went to Melbourne High School and has a degree in economics from Monash University.

Thomas was also a professional musician (trumpet and singing) performing with various Australian military bands.
He trained in drama at Richmond Drama School in London and in improvisation at The Second City in Los Angeles. He has appeared in numerous commercials including an infamous Continental Sauces commercial with Mena Suvari and a Virgin Mobile commercial with Jane Lynch. He has also appeared in two Super Bowl commercials. In 2003 for Washington Mutual (with Scott Adsit) and in 2011 for Bridgestone's "Reply All". As a stand-up comedian, he has performed in London, Kuala Lumpur, Sydney and Los Angeles.

He has also voiced the Geico Gecko.

Filmography

Live action roles

Films
Bigger Than Tina – Additional role

Television

Voice roles

Film

Television animation

Video games

References

External links
Official voiceover site

Profile of a Pro Voiceover: Tom Brom

Australian male comedians
Living people
Alumni of Richmond Drama School
Australian male film actors
Australian male television actors
Australian male video game actors
Australian male voice actors
Australian musicians
Australian trumpeters
Place of birth missing (living people)
21st-century trumpeters
Year of birth missing (living people)